The Teleport Bridge is a bridge in Odaiba, connecting the Aomi and Daiba areas of Tokyo, Japan.

External links

 

Bridges in Tokyo
Odaiba